Gary Yaremchuk (born August 15, 1961) is a Canadian retired professional ice hockey player. He played 34 games in the National Hockey League (NHL) with the Toronto Maple Leafs between 1981 and 1985, though mostly played in the American Hockey League at that time. He moved to Europe in 1986, and played in different countries there until he retired in 1994. His brother, Ken Yaremchuk, also played in the NHL.

Career statistics

Regular season and playoffs

External links
 

1961 births
Living people
Adirondack Red Wings players
Canadian expatriate ice hockey players in England
Canadian expatriate ice hockey players in Finland
Canadian expatriate ice hockey players in France
Canadian expatriate ice hockey players in Germany
Canadian expatriate ice hockey players in Italy
Canadian ice hockey centres
Canadian people of Ukrainian descent
Cincinnati Tigers players
Durham Wasps players
Gothiques d'Amiens players
HC Gardena players
Ice hockey people from Alberta
Jokerit players
KooKoo players
Oulun Kärpät players
Portland Winterhawks players
Ratingen EC players
St. Catharines Saints players
Ice hockey people from Edmonton
Toronto Maple Leafs draft picks
Toronto Maple Leafs players